1776 is a 1972 American musical drama film directed by Peter H. Hunt. The screenplay by Peter Stone was based on his book for the 1969 Broadway musical of the same name. Set in Philadelphia in the summer of 1776, it is a fictionalized account of the events leading up to the signing of the Declaration of Independence. The song score was composed by Sherman Edwards. The film stars William Daniels, Howard da Silva, Donald Madden, John Cullum, Ken Howard and Blythe Danner.

Portions of the dialogue and some of the song lyrics were taken directly from the letters and memoirs of the actual participants of the Second Continental Congress.

Plot 

John Adams, representing Massachusetts in the Second Continental Congress in Philadelphia, laments the body’s refusal to debate his motion to declare the colonies’ independence from Great Britain and instead to discuss more trivial matters. Disliked by most of his fellow Congressmen, he frequently seeks advice and comfort from his wife, Abigail. Benjamin Franklin of Pennsylvania suggests someone else propose the independence resolution. They get Richard Henry Lee of Virginia to agree and he rides home to get authorization from the state legislature to do so. 

Lee returns, proposes the resolution and, over the objections of John Dickinson of Pennsylvania, leader of the faction seeking reconciliation with Britain, Congress agrees to debate the question. Caesar Rodney of Delaware, suffering from cancer, leaves during the debate, depriving Adams of Delaware’s vote. Seeking to kill the motion, Dickinson successfully moves that an independence vote be unanimous. To salvage the motion, Adams asks for a postponement to draft a declaration of grievances. President of the Congress, John Hancock, breaks the tie vote in favor of a declaration and appoints Adams, Roger Sherman of Connecticut, Robert Livingston of New York, and Thomas Jefferson of Virginia to a committee to write it. Jefferson, despite his determination to go home to his wife, Martha, reluctantly agrees to be the primary writer. After a full week passes without completing the task, Adams summons Martha, who charms both him and Franklin, to Philadelphia and Jefferson finishes the draft. 

To convince Samuel Chase of Maryland to support independence, Adams agrees to accept General George Washington’s invitation to visit the army encampment in New Brunswick, New Jersey, taking Franklin and Chase with him. After the members return to their lodgings, a military courier arrives and sadly tells Andrew McNair, the Congressional custodian, of how his best friend was killed in battle. 

The Declaration is read to the full Congress which begins accepting amendments. Jefferson agrees to all changes, but refuses to strike language related to slavery. Edward Rutledge of South Carolina leads the Southern members in walking out in protest just as Chase returns with Maryland’s vote supporting independence. Frustrated at Adams’ haughtiness and refusal to compromise, Franklin tells him to accept the fact that those with opinions contrary to his will be part of their new nation. 

On the day of the vote, Adams and Jefferson agree to drop the slavery provision and Rutledge and the other Southern states vote for independence. With Delaware divided, Rodney is brought back to support independence by majority vote of its three representatives. Eventually, all states, except divided Pennsylvania and New York, whose remaining representative, Lewis Morris, has abstained throughout the proceedings, vote for independence. Franklin moves that his delegation be polled: he votes for independence and Dickinson votes against it, leaving the question up to James Wilson. Not wanting to be remembered as the sole representative who opposed American independence, he votes in favor. Dickinson resigns from Congress and vows to join the army to support the fight against the British, even though he believes it to be futile. 

As the members prepare to sign the Declaration of Independence on July 4, 1776, Morris receives word that his estate has been destroyed and his family moved to safety. Despite not being authorized, he signs anyway. As McNair tolls the building’s bell, one member per state signs, establishing the United States of America.

Cast 
 Delegates
An asterisk (*) indicates an actor or actress who was also in the original Broadway cast.

 William Daniels as John Adams (MA)*
 David Ford as John Hancock (MA)*
 Ken Howard as Thomas Jefferson (VA)*
 Ron Holgate as Richard Henry Lee (VA)*
 Howard da Silva as Benjamin Franklin (PA)*
 Donald Madden as John Dickinson (PA)
 Emory Bass as James Wilson (PA)*
 John Cullum as Edward Rutledge (SC)*
 Jonathan Moore as Lyman Hall (GA)*
 Roy Poole as Stephen Hopkins (RI)*
 Howard Caine as Lewis Morris (NY)
 John Myhers as Robert Livingston (NY)
 Rex Robbins as Roger Sherman (CT)
 William Hansen as Caesar Rodney (DE)
 Ray Middleton as Thomas McKean (DE)
 Leo Leyden as George Read (DE)
 James Noble as Reverend John Witherspoon (NJ)
 Charles Rule as Joseph Hewes (NC)*
 Patrick Hines as Samuel Chase (MD)
 Daniel Keyes as Josiah Bartlett (NH)

 Others

 Blythe Danner as Martha Jefferson
 Virginia Vestoff as Abigail Adams*
 Ralston Hill as Charles Thomson, Secretary of the Continental Congress*
 William Duell as Andrew McNair, Congressional custodian*
 Stephen Nathan as Courier

Musical numbers and soundtrack 

 Overture – Orchestra
 "Sit Down, John" – John Adams, Congress
 "Piddle, Twiddle and Resolve" – John Adams
 "Till Then" – John and Abigail Adams
 "The Lees of Old Virginia" – Richard Henry Lee, Benjamin Franklin, John Adams
 "But, Mr. Adams" – John Adams, Benjamin Franklin, Thomas Jefferson, Roger Sherman, Robert Livingston
 "Yours, Yours, Yours" – John and Abigail Adams
 "He Plays the Violin" – Martha Jefferson, Benjamin Franklin, John Adams
 "Cool, Cool, Considerate Men" – John Dickinson, John Hancock, The Conservatives
 "Momma Look Sharp" – Courier, Andrew McNair, Leather Apron
 "The Egg" – Ben Franklin, John Adams, Thomas Jefferson
 "Molasses to Rum" – Edward Rutledge
 "Compliments" – Abigail Adams
 "Is Anybody There?" – Charles Thomson, John Adams
 Finale – Orchestra

An original motion picture soundtrack album was released in 1972 by Columbia Records on vinyl LP records. It contains all the musical numbers, with the exception of "Cool, Cool Considerate Men" and "Compliments". The soundtrack also contains the edited versions of some of the musical numbers that were presented in full on the laserdisc and DVD releases. Although the Original Broadway Cast recording was released on CD in 1992, the film soundtrack was not.

Production 
Jack L. Warner bought the film rights to the musical for $1.25 million.

Many members of the original Broadway cast, including William Daniels, Ken Howard, John Cullum, and Howard da Silva, reprised their roles for the film. Ralston Hill, Ron Holgate, David Ford, Charles Rule and others repeated their roles from the Broadway production, marking their only appearances in feature film. This was a decision Warner made himself after feeling he made a mistake by turning down Julie Andrews for the 1964 film adaptation of My Fair Lady in favor of Audrey Hepburn.

1776 was also the only film of Donald Madden, who was not in the original Broadway cast.

Exteriors were filmed at the Warner Ranch in Burbank, California, the former Columbia Pictures backlot, where they built an entire street of Colonial Philadelphia. Most of the Colonial sets were destroyed by a fire in the mid-1970s.

The water fountain seen during the musical number "The Lees of Old Virginia", with Ben Franklin, John Adams, and Richard Henry Lee, became known to television viewers as the fountain seen during the beginning credits of the TV series Friends. This fountain still exists directly across the street from the Bewitched and I Dream of Jeannie houses.

Interiors were shot at the old Columbia studio on Gower Street in Hollywood. 1776 was among the final films shot at Gower Studios before the Warner/Columbia merger in 1971.

"Cool, Cool, Considerate Men" was cut from the film prior to its release and not included on the soundtrack recording nor on the first VHS tapes and laserdiscs. The Los Angeles Times stated "The song 'Cool, Cool, Considerate Men' depicts Revolutionary War–era conservatives as power-hungry wheedlers focused on maintaining wealth." According to Jack L. Warner, the film's producer and a friend of President Richard Nixon, Nixon requested the song be removed. He apparently saw it as an insult, as it suggested that the conservatives were the ones who were hindering American independence as they danced a minuet singing the song that included the stanza,

The song is anachronistic, because the terms "right" and "left" in politics were not coined until the French Revolution.

Warner's attempt to comply with Nixon's demands had initially been rebuffed by director Hunt during production, only for the song to be removed in post-production while Hunt was on vacation. Warner also wanted the original negative of the song shredded, but the film's editor kept it in storage unaltered. (The footage, some of physically poor quality, was restored for the DVD and Blu-Ray releases.) Trailers had already been released in theaters with the "Considerate Men" number as its centerpiece; Warner had those trailers pulled and re-edited. In a 2015 interview, Hunt mentioned that Warner, on his deathbed in 1978, told a friend that he regretted editing the scene, believing that he had ruined the structure of the film as a result. It was only decades later that the song was restored to the film.

When the Broadway musical was about to be presented to Nixon at the White House in 1970, before the film was made, his staff pressed the producers to cut the song then; their request was denied.

Historical accuracy 
According to The Columbia Companion to American History on Film, historical "[i]naccuracies pervade 1776, though few are very troubling." Because Congress was held in secrecy and there are no contemporary records on the debate over the Declaration of Independence, the authors of the play created the narrative based on later accounts and educated guesses, inventing scenes and dialogue as needed for storytelling purposes. Some of the dialogue was taken from words written, often years or even decades later, by the actual people involved, and rearranged for dramatic effect.

The film particularly omits the views of the mid-Atlantic Quaker population, represented by Dickinson. Although in the film Dickinson is portrayed as loyalist, and John Adams is seen making the points of objection about the tax abuses of George III of the United Kingdom, including regressive taxes and "taxation without representation", all to fund wars and the King's lifestyle, not to benefit the people, it was Dickinson's Letters from a Farmer in Pennsylvania that had originally made these points. A supposed physical fight between Dickinson and Adams is portrayed, in which Dickinson calls Adams a "lawyer" as an epithet, which makes little sense as Dickinson was a lawyer himself.

Despite the film's inclusion of Martha Jefferson and Abigail Adams, Dickinson's wife, Mary Norris Dickinson, was the only spouse actually present in Philadelphia during the convention. (Franklin's common law wife, Deborah Read, had died a year or so earlier. Martha Jefferson had just suffered a miscarriage and was dealing with complications of gestational diabetes in Virginia.)

Another departure from history is that the separation from Great Britain was accomplished in two steps: the actual vote for independence came on July 2 with the approval of Lee's resolution of independence. The wording of the Declaration of Independence—the statement to the world as to the reasons necessitating the split—was then debated for three days before being approved on July 4. The vote for independence did not hinge on passages being removed from the Declaration, since Congress had already voted in favor of independence. For the sake of drama, the play's authors combined the two events. In addition, some historians believe that the Declaration was not signed on July 4, but was instead signed on August 2, 1776. Others note that the final copy of the document was signed by the delegates over several weeks and months, commencing in July and not completed until as late as September.

The Liberty Bell in 1776 is shown being rung as the delegates were signing the Declaration on July 4; however, Independence Hall's wooden steeple was structurally unstable, and the Liberty Bell was silent, having been lowered into the upper chamber of the brick tower. A smaller bell, used to toll the hours, may have rung on July 8, for the public reading of the Declaration.

Many characters in 1776 differ from their historical counterparts. Central to the drama is the depiction of John Adams as "obnoxious and disliked." According to biographer David McCullough, Adams was one of the most respected members of Congress in 1776. Adams's often-quoted description of himself in Congress as "obnoxious, suspected, and unpopular" is from a letter written 46 years later in 1822, after his unpopular presidency had likely colored his view of the past. According to McCullough, no delegate described Adams as obnoxious in 1776. Historian Garry Wills earlier made a similar argument, writing that "historians relay John Adams's memories without sufficient skepticism", and that it was Dickinson, not Adams, who was advocating an unpopular position in 1776.

The Committee of Five appointed to write the Declaration of Independence were: Franklin, age 70 (Howard da Silva was 62 at the time of filming in 1971); Roger Sherman, 55 (Rex Robbins was 36); Adams, 41 (Daniels was 44); Jefferson 33 (Ken Howard was 27); and Livingston, 29 (John Myhers was 49). The lyrics of "But Mr. Adams" give the reason that Livingston can not write the Declaration is because "I've been presented with a new son by the noble stork", but Livingston actually had only two children, both daughters, and the elder was not born until 1780.

For practical and dramatic purposes, the work does not depict all of the more than 50 members of Congress who were present at the time. This version of John Adams is, in part, a composite character, combining the real Adams with his cousin Samuel Adams, who was in Congress at the time but is not depicted in the play. Although the play depicts Delaware's Caesar Rodney as an elderly man near death from skin cancer (which would eventually kill him), he was just 47 years old at the time and continued to be very active in the Revolution after signing the Declaration. He was not absent from the voting because of health; however, the play is accurate in having him arrive "in the nick of time", having ridden  the night before (an event depicted on Delaware's 1999 State Quarter) unaided, instead of with the help of another delegate. Further, Richard Henry Lee announces that he is returning to Virginia to serve as governor. He was never governor; his cousin Henry Lee (who is anachronistically called "General 'Lighthorse' Harry Lee", a rank and nickname earned later) did eventually become governor (and the father of Confederate general Robert E. Lee). John Adams was also depicted as disliking Richard Henry Lee, but according to McCullough, Adams expressed nothing but "respect and admiration for the tall, masterly Virginian." He did dislike Benjamin Franklin, contrary to what was portrayed.

Martha Jefferson never traveled to Philadelphia to be with her husband; she was extremely ill during the summer of 1776, having just endured a miscarriage. The play's authors invented the scene "to show something of the young Jefferson's life without destroying the unity of setting." Martha is also depicted as dancing a galop or polka with Franklin and Adams, dances not introduced until the 1800s.

James Wilson was not the indecisive milquetoast depicted in the play and the film. His patrician WASP accent in the film is misleading, since Wilson was a Scottish immigrant whose parents were farmers. The real Wilson, who was not yet a judge in 1776, had been cautious about supporting independence at an earlier date, but he supported the resolution of independence when it came up for a vote. Pennsylvania's deciding swing vote was actually cast by John Morton, who is not depicted in the musical.

The quote attributed to Edmund Burke by Dr. Lyman Hall in a key scene with Adams is a paraphrase of a real quote by Burke.

The song "Cool Considerate Men" is anachronistic; the terms "right" and "left" in politics were not in use until the French Revolution of 1789. John Dickinson, who is portrayed as an antagonist here, was motivated mainly by his Quaker roots and his respect for the British Constitution, having lived in England for 3 years in the 1750s. He was no wealthier than some members of the pro-Independence faction, and freed his slaves in 1777. Thomas Jefferson wrote that "his name will be consecrated in history as one of the great worthies of the revolution".

The film also misses the objection some had to the Declaration's stated basis in "rights of Man" based in "natural law" derived from a supernatural being. The Quaker-based population in the mid-Atlantic, represented by Dickinson, objected to this conception. Dickinson's objection to the Declaration had to do with this, as well as the fact he and his base preferred civil disobedience to war as the means, and a view that the colonies were too immature and the egalitarian mid-Atlantic culture would be overruled by the slavery of the South and the patriarchal Puritan attitudes of New England, represented by John Adams, in the foundation of the new country. The film also omits the fact that Dickinson, after refusing to sign the Declaration, set about drafting the Articles of Confederation, which he based on "rights of Person" with no reference to anything but law created by human beings and the only reference to "men" being in the context of mustering armies. This basis was then used when the Articles were converted to the Constitution but by then completely omitting the word "man" and only using the word "Person."

The musical also deviates from history in its portrayal of attitudes about slavery. In 1776, after a dramatic debate over slavery, the southern delegates walk out in protest of the Declaration's denunciation of the slave trade, and only support independence when that language was removed from the Declaration. The walkout is fictional, as the debate over the wording of the declaration took place after the vote for independence on July 2, and apparently most delegates, northern and southern, supported the deletion of the clause.

The musical depicts Edward Rutledge as the leader of the opposition to an anti-slavery clause in Jefferson's original draft of the Declaration. However, while it is known that, according to Jefferson, the clause was opposed by South Carolina and Georgia, plus unspecified "northern brethren", that is all that is known about opposition to the clause. Rutledge was a delegate from South Carolina, but there is no historical evidence that he played any part—much less a leadership role—in the opposition to the clause. The musical does acknowledge the complexity of the Colonial attitudes toward slavery in the dramatic song "Molasses to Rum to Slaves", sung by the Rutledge character, which illustrates the hypocrisy in northern condemnations of slavery since northerners profited from the triangle trade.

The musical depicts Franklin as claiming that he is the founder of the first abolitionist organization in the New World; the real Franklin did not become an abolitionist until after the American Revolution, becoming president of the Pennsylvania Abolition Society in 1785. It was actually Dickinson who freed his slaves in 1776, conditionally at first, and fully by 1787 when the Constitution was ratified.

In both the play and the film, John Adams sarcastically predicts that Benjamin Franklin will receive from posterity too great a share of credit for the Revolution. "Franklin smote the ground and out sprang—George Washington. Fully grown, and on his horse. Franklin then electrified them with his miraculous lightning rod and the three of them—Franklin, Washington, and the horse—conducted the entire Revolution all by themselves." Adams did make a similar comment about Franklin in April 1790, just after Franklin's death, although the mention of the horse was a humorous twist added by the authors of the musical.

James Wilson is portrayed as subordinating himself to Dickinson's opposition to independence, only changing his vote so that he would not be remembered unfavorably. In fact, Wilson was considered one of the leading thinkers behind the American cause, consistently supporting and arguing for independence, although he would not cast his vote until his district had been caucused.

The formula John Adams gives Abigail for making saltpeter—"By treating sodium nitrate with potassium chloride, of course!"—refers to various chemicals by their modern names, instead of the names used in the 1770s. A more historically accurate version might be "treating soda niter with potash." More accurate still would have been a detailed description of the process, involving ingredients such as manure or bat guano, but that probably would have been too long, and repulsive to audiences.

Abigail's request for pins in exchange is not frivolous. Electroplating had not been invented yet: The common pin was subject to rusting and breakage, and so required replacement. At the time, pins were necessary for a wide range of crafts, creating garments and headgear (including wigs), making lace, ribbon and other trimmings and textiles. They also served the roles now played by paperclips and staples. Women used them as closures or to anchor pieces of clothing. (Hooks and eyes existed, but like so many manufactured goods, they had to be imported. The hook-and-eye industry was not established in the United States until the early 19th century.) The real Abigail, if dressed as in this scene in the film, would have supported the front lacing of her gown by using pins to fasten the fabric to the stiffened bodice beneath.

Reception

Critical reception 
Vincent Canby of The New York Times observed, "The music is resolutely unmemorable. The lyrics sound as if they'd been written by someone high on root beer, and the book is familiar history—compressed here, stretched there—that has been gagged up and paced to Broadway's not inspiring standards. Yet Peter H. Hunt's screen version of 1776 ... insists on being so entertaining and, at times, even moving, that you might as well stop resisting it. This reaction, I suspect, represents a clear triumph of emotional associations over material ... [It] is far from being a landmark of musical cinema, but it is the first film in my memory that comes close to treating seriously a magnificent chapter in the American history."

Roger Ebert of the Chicago Sun-Times gave 1776 two stars and declared, "This is an insult to the real men who were Adams, Jefferson, Franklin and the rest ... The performances trapped inside these roles, as you might expect, are fairly dreadful. There are good actors in the movie (especially William Daniels as Adams and Donald Madden as John Dickinson), but they're forced to strut and posture so much that you wonder if they ever scratched or spit or anything ... I can hardly bear to remember the songs, much less discuss them. Perhaps I shouldn't. It is just too damn bad this movie didn't take advantage of its right to the pursuit of happiness."

Rotten Tomatoes rates the picture 74%, based on 19 reviews by critics.

Box office 
The film was the Christmas attraction at Radio City Music Hall in New York City and performed very well, grossing $1,743,978 in its first 6 weeks. It did not perform as well in its other opening engagements in Philadelphia, Boston and Washington. The film returned to the Music Hall for two weeks starting June 3, 1976 in honor of the United States Bicentennial.

Accolades 
The film was nominated for the Golden Globe Award for Best Motion Picture – Musical or Comedy but lost to Cabaret. Harry Stradling Jr. was nominated for the Academy Award for Best Cinematography but lost to Geoffrey Unsworth for Cabaret.

The film is recognized by American Film Institute in these lists:
 2006: AFI's Greatest Movie Musicals – Nominated

Home media 
The film was first released on videocassette, which runs 148 minutes, (Rated G) and on laserdisc in the 1980s. The Laserdisc version runs 180 minutes and is rated PG. The DVD was released as a "Restored Director's Cut" on July 2, 2002, And rated PG. This 165-minute version, trims up some scenes and contains clips that were unreleased and unavailable in videocassette versions, including the "Cool, Cool Considerate Men" musical number and accompanying dialogue. It does not include the previously released Overture (heard on laser disc but not in cinemas),is considered director Peter Hunt's preferred version, hence its "director's cut" moniker.

The film was released on Blu-ray from a 4K-master on June 2, 2015. It contains two commentaries: an all-new commentary, with director Peter H. Hunt, William Daniels, and Ken Howard, and also the DVD version's commentary with Hunt and Peter Stone only. It also contains two versions of the film: the DVD's "Director's Cut", and an "extended cut" adding an additional 2 minutes and 44 seconds to the DVD edition's time. It also includes two deleted and alternative scenes with filmmaker commentary, screen tests, and original theatrical release trailers.

On May 31, 2022, Sony Pictures released a 3-disc 50th anniversary edition of the film. The release includes four different cuts: the 165-minute and 167-minute cuts of the film,(from the 2015 DVD release), on 4K for the first time, featuring a Dolby Atmos soundtrack. A 3rd, bonus Blu-ray disc includes the original 148-minute 1972 theatrical cut that was only available on VHS (now in HD with the original mono soundtrack) and the 1992 180-minute LaserDisc cut (in SD with stereo soundtrack) (both featured on Blu-ray for the first time).

Comic book adaptation 
 Charlton Comics: 1776 (March 1973):

See also 
 List of American films of 1972
 List of films about the American Revolution
 List of television series and miniseries about the American Revolution
 Founding Fathers of the United States

References

External links 

 
 
 
 
 

1972 films
1972 comedy films
1972 drama films
1970s historical musical films
1970s musical comedy-drama films
American musical comedy-drama films
1970s English-language films
Films directed by Peter H. Hunt
American Revolutionary War films
Films about presidents of the United States
Films set in Pennsylvania
Films set in Philadelphia
Films set in 1776
Independence Day (United States) films
Musical films based on actual events
United States Declaration of Independence
Columbia Pictures films
Cultural depictions of Thomas Jefferson
Cultural depictions of George Washington
Cultural depictions of Benjamin Franklin
Cultural depictions of John Adams
Cultural depictions of John Hancock
Films adapted into comics
Films based on musicals
1970s American films